Owzan Bijeh (also Romanized as Owzan Bījeh, Ozūnbījeh, Uzunbījeh, Ūzūn Bījeh, and Vazan Bījeh) is a village in Garmkhan Rural District, Garmkhan District, Bojnord County, North Khorasan Province, Iran. At the 2006 census, its population was 297, in 77 families.

References 

Populated places in Bojnord County